Terrell Davis, known by the stage name Ralo, is an American rapper signed to Gucci Mane's 1017 Records via Interscope Records and his own label Famerica Records. Ralo gained recognition following the release of his single, "Can't Lie" featuring rapper Future, which was released in 2015. Spin magazine placed the song at number 65 on its "Every Future Song of 2015, Ranked" list. In 2015 Ralo released the mixtapes Famerican Gangster and Diary of the Streets.

Personal life
Ralo is from Atlanta, Georgia. He practices Islam. He was arrested for a criminal conspiracy charge in April 2018. In March 2022 he was sentenced to eight years and one month in federal prison, he will also serve five years of supervised parole following his release.

Discography

Mixtapes

References

External links

1991 births
Living people
African-American male rappers
Rappers from Atlanta
Southern hip hop musicians
African-American Muslims
21st-century American rappers
21st-century American male musicians
21st-century African-American musicians